Chrysallis is a genus of small, air-breathing land snails, terrestrial pulmonate gastropod mollusks in the subfamily Helicostylinae  of the family Camaenidae.

Species
 Chrysallis albolabris Bartsch, 1932
 Chrysallis antonii (C. Semper, 1877)
 Chrysallis aspersa (Grateloup, 1840)
 Chrysallis caniceps Bartsch, 1932
 Chrysallis chrysalidiformis (G. B. Sowerby I, 1833)
 Chrysallis corrugata Bartsch, 1932
 Chrysallis electrica (Reeve, 1848)
 Chrysallis jayi Bartsch, 1932
 Chrysallis lichnifer (Mörch, 1850)
 Chrysallis mindoroensis (Broderip, 1841)
 Chrysallis nigriceps Bartsch, 1932
 Chrysallis palliobasis Bartsch, 1932
 Chrysallis perturbator Bartsch, 1932
 Chrysallis pettiti Bartsch, 1932
 Chrysallis rollei (Möllendorff, 1898)
 Chrysallis roseolabra (Bartsch, 1932)
Species brought into synonymy
 Chrysallis antoni (C. Semper, 1877) accepted as Chrysallis antonii (C. Semper, 1877) (misspelling of species name)

References

 Bank, R. A. (2017). Classification of the Recent terrestrial Gastropoda of the World. Last update: July 16, 2017

External links
  Albers, J. C. (1850). Die Heliceen nach natürlicher Verwandtschaft systematisch geordnet. Berlin: Enslin. 262 pp
 Albers, J. C.; Martens, E. von. (1860). Die Heliceen nach natürlicher Verwandtschaft systematisch geordnet von Joh. Christ. Albers. Ed. 2. Pp. i-xviii, 1-359. Leipzig: Engelman

Camaenidae